The Crown of Lies is a lost 1926 American silent romantic drama film directed by Dimitri Buchowetzki and starring Pola Negri. It was produced/financed by Famous Players-Lasky and distributed by Paramount Pictures.

Cast
Pola Negri as Olga Kriga
Noah Beery as Count Mirko
Robert Ames as John Knight
Charles A. Post as Karl
Arthur Hoyt as Fritz
Michael Vavitch as Vorski
Cissy Fitzgerald as Leading Lady
May Foster as Landlady
Frankie Bailey as Actress
Edward Cecil as Leading Man
Erwin Connelly as Stage Manager

References

External links

Poster

1926 films
1926 romantic drama films
American romantic drama films
American silent feature films
Films directed by Dimitri Buchowetzki
Lost American films
Paramount Pictures films
Films set in Europe
American black-and-white films
Lost romantic drama films
1926 lost films
1920s American films
Silent romantic drama films
Silent American drama films